The 2011–12 Liga de Fútbol Profesional Boliviano season was the 35th season of LFPB.

Teams
The number of teams for 2011 remains the same. Jorge Wilstermann finished last in the 2010 relegation table and was relegated to the  Bolivian Football Regional Leagues (and the new Nacional B second division) for the first time since the club was founded. They were replaced by the 2010 Copa Simón Bolívar champion Nacional Potosí, who last played in the LFPB in 2009.

Torneo Apertura

First phase

Standings

Serie A

Serie B

Results

Second phase

Quarterfinals

Quarterfinals 1

Quarterfinals 2

Quarterfinals 3

Quarterfinals 4

Semifinals

Semifinals 1

Semifinals 2

Third-place finals

Finals

Top goalscorers
Source:

Torneo Clausura

Standings

Results

Top goalscorers
Source:

Relegation

Source:

Relegation/promotion playoff

References

External links
 Official website of the LFPB 
 Official regulations 

2012
2012 in South American football leagues
2011 in South American football leagues
1